Howmeh-ye Sharqi Rural District is a rural district (dehestan) in the Central District of Khorramshahr County, Khuzestan Province, Iran. At the 2006 census, its population was 8,388, in 1,594 families.  The rural district has 16 villages.

References 

Rural Districts of Khuzestan Province
Khorramshahr County